A. Sumru Özsoy is a leading linguist and Turkish academic working at Boğaziçi University, Istanbul.

Education
Özsoy received a bachelor's degree in comparative literature from Robert College in 1971. She obtained a master's degree in linguistics from Boğaziçi University in 1975 and a PhD in linguistics from the University of Michigan in 1983. Title of her PhD thesis is "Kendi-reflexivization in Turkish: A syntactic, semantic and discourse analysis".

Career
Özsoy started her career as an English instructor in 1972. She was a teaching assistant at the University of Michigan from 1977 to 1983. Then she joined Boğaziçi University in 1983 and became professor of linguistics at the Department of Western Languages and Literatures in 1994.

She represents the Turkish Linguistics Community at the Permanent International Committee of Linguists (CPIL).

Work
Özsoy's fields of study are syntax, structure of Turkish, Caucasian languages, cognitive linguistics, sign languages and Turkish Sign Language. She is one of the linguists who studied the now extinct language Ubykh focusing on its syntax. She studied with Tevfik Esenç, the last fluent speaker of Ubykh, in his later years. She organized an international conference, namely Conference on Northwest Caucasian Linguistics, at Boğaziçi University in 1994 in memory of Georges Dumézil, who analysed the language in detail, and Esenç.

She is the author of several books, including Türkçe-Turkish (1999) and Türkçe'nin Yapısı. Sesbilim (2004; Structure of Turkish. Phonology). She has also published numerous articles in her fields of study.

She was the coeditor of Dilbilim Araştırmaları from 1990 to 2011 and has been among the editors of Turkic Languages since 1997 which is published by the Harrassowitz publishing house.

References

Living people
Robert College alumni
Boğaziçi University alumni
University of Michigan alumni
Academic staff of Boğaziçi University
Turkish women academics
Linguists from Turkey
Linguists of Turkic languages
Linguists of Northwest Caucasian languages
Ubykh language
Women orientalists
Women linguists
20th-century linguists
21st-century linguists
Year of birth missing (living people)
20th-century Turkish women
21st-century Turkish women